Rogerio Caetano (born Goiânia, September 26, 1977) is a Brazilian musician, arranger, musical producer and composer. Bachelor of Music in Composition by the University of Brasília, he is an awarded virtuoso and international reference in 7 string guitar. Using a revolutionary language, within the choro and samba music genres and mixing jazz elements, he represents a new school for this instrument.

He has a method for the instrument and a discography with 11 albums, being awarded in 2016 in the Brazilian Music Prize. In 2015 and 2019 he was awarded the IMA (Independent Music Awards), Best Instrumentalists 2015/Embrulhador, and 2017 and 2021, in the Music Pro Awards.

His partners include Yamandu Costa, Hamilton de Holanda, Daniel Santiago, Marco Pereira, Eduardo Neves, Celsinho Silva, Luís Barcelos, Gian Correa, and Cristovão Bastos.

He has been promoting his art in Brazil and abroad, performing concerts in countries such as Germany, France, Italy, Spain, Austria, Portugal, Holland, Belgium, USA, China, India, Israel, Turkey, South Africa, and Ecuador.

He has recorded with artists such as Zeca Pagodinho, Paulinho da Viola, Arlindo Cruz, Beth Carvalho, Caetano Veloso, Monarco, Dona Ivone Lara, Maria Bethânia, Nana Caymmi, Ivan Lins, Alcione, Zélia Duncan, Diogo Nogueira, Teresa Cristina, among many others.

In partnership with Marco Pereira, Rogerio Caetano wrote the "SETE CORDAS, TÉCNICA E ESTILO" method, a work that deeply addresses the language of the 7-string guitar, mainly in the universe of choro and samba.

Also participated as protagonist of the series / documentary Sete Vidas em Sete Cordas that has been exhibited with great success in the Canal Brasil and TV Cultura.

In 2021, his album Cristovão Bastos e Rogério Caetano (with Cristóvão Bastos) was nominated for the Latin Grammy Award for Best Instrumental Album.

Discography 
 Abre Alas, Brasilia Brasil. Hamilton de Holanda, Daniel Santiago, Rogério Caetano. 2001
 Pitando o Sete. Rogério Caetano. 2004
 Rogério Caetano. 2009.
 Yamandu Costa & Rogério Caetano. 2012
 Só Alegria. Celsinho Silva, Eduardo Neves, Luis Barcelos, Rogério Caetano. 2013
 Rogério Caetano e Eduardo Neves. Cosmopolita. 2016
 Rogério Caetano Convida. 2017.
 Rogério Caetano e Gian Correa, 7. 2018
 Cristóvão Bastos e Rogério Caetano. 2020
 Brasília Brasil Trio Ao Vivo. 2020
 Rogério Caetano Solo. 2021

Productions 
 Tocata à Amizade. 2015. Yamandu Costa, Rogério Caetano, Alessandro Kramer, Luis Barcelos.
 Um abraço no Raphael Rabello, 50 anos. 2012.

Awards 
 IMA (Independent Music Awards) 2015
Best Instrumentalists 2015 - Embrulhador
 27° Prêmio da Música Brasileira 2016
 Music Pro Awards 2017
Music Pro Awards 2018

References 

1977 births
Living people
Samba musicians
Popular music composers
Choro musicians
Instrumental music
Acoustic guitarists
Brazilian composers
Brazilian music
Brazilian music arrangers
21st-century guitarists